Li Yuejiu (born July 4, 1957) is a male Chinese former gymnast.

Li was born in Liaoning Province. He competed at the 1984 Olympic Games, and won a silver medal in the Men's Team competition. He was China's first World Champion in floor exercise in 1981. Li retired in October 1984. He went on to study in Canada, and became a coach for the Canadian national gymnastic team. He married in 1986. Later, he and his wife coached in Las Vegas in the United States.

He was the coordinator of the 2008 Chinese men's and women's Olympic teams and led both teams to an Olympic gold medal, as well as the 2006 World Championship team title.

Li's wife is Wu Jiani, also a famed Chinese gymnast. One of their daughters is Anna Li, who competed for the UCLA Bruins gymnastics team during the 2007 – 2010 seasons at the same Pauley Pavilion where her parents won their Olympic medals. Following the Visa Championships and two selection camps at the Karolyi Ranch in New Waverly, Texas, Anna Li was named to the U.S. 2011 World Championship Team.

Li and Wu were the coaches for World Silver Medalist Mackenzie Caquatto from 2004. In April 2009, they opened Legacy Elite Gymnastics in Carol Stream, Illinois.

References

External links 
 
 
 

1957 births
Living people
Chinese male artistic gymnasts
Medalists at the World Artistic Gymnastics Championships
Olympic gymnasts of China
Olympic silver medalists for China
Olympic medalists in gymnastics
Gymnasts at the 1984 Summer Olympics
Medalists at the 1984 Summer Olympics
Asian Games medalists in gymnastics
Asian Games gold medalists for China
Asian Games silver medalists for China
Asian Games bronze medalists for China
Gymnasts at the 1978 Asian Games
Gymnasts at the 1982 Asian Games
Medalists at the 1978 Asian Games
Medalists at the 1982 Asian Games
Universiade medalists in gymnastics
Universiade silver medalists for China
Gymnasts from Liaoning
Medalists at the 1981 Summer Universiade
20th-century Chinese people